The 1945 Baylor Bears football team represented Baylor University in the Southwest Conference (SWC) during the 1945 college football season. In their third, non-consecutive season under head coach Frank Kimbrough, the Bears compiled a 5–5–1 record (2–4 against conference opponents), finished in sixth place in the conference, and outscored opponents by a combined total of 178 to 141. They played their home games at Municipal Stadium in Waco, Texas.  Jack O. Price and Richard "Bull" Johnson were the team captains.

Schedule

References

Baylor
Baylor Bears football seasons
Baylor Bears football